El Segundo Unified School District is a school district headquartered in El Segundo, California, United States. The district serves all residents living in El Segundo and covers the western part of the city; the portion of the Wiseburn School District in El Segundo has businesses but no residents.

History
In 1912 the El Segundo School District opened, taking territory from the Wiseburn School District. At that time the area was within the Inglewood Union High School District, now known as the Centinela Valley Union High School District. On November 22, 1925, the El Segundo High School District was formed and El Segundo withdrew from the Inglewood Union district. In 1979, El Segundo Junior High School was closed due to low enrollment and the National Football League Los Angeles Raiders occupied the building, using it as their headquarters from 1982 until 1996. With climbing enrollment, the now renamed El Segundo Middle School was re-opened in 1999.

Schools

Adult schools
 South Bay Adult School

Secondary schools
Zoned
 El Segundo High School
 El Segundo Middle School
Alternative
 Arena High School & the Virtual Academy
 Southern California Regional Occupational Center

Primary schools
Elementary schools
 Center Street School
 Richmond Street School
Preschool
Eagle's Nest Preschool

References

External links
 

School districts in Los Angeles County, California
El Segundo, California
1912 establishments in California
School districts established in 1912